Qizilbash, Kizilbash or Qazalbash is a Turkic-language family name. Notable people with the name include:

Asad Qizilbash
Muzaffar Ali Khan Qizilbash
Shahtaj Qizilbash
Mahjabin Qizilbash

See also
Javanshir Qizilbash

References